Teitur Örn Einarsson (born 23 September 1998) is an Icelandic handball player for SG Flensburg-Handewitt and the Icelandic national team.

He represented Iceland at the 2019 World Men's Handball Championship.

Club career
Teitur Örn Einarsson made his debut for his boyhood club Selfoss in the 2015/2016 season where he helped his team secure a promotion to Úrvalsdeild. In the summer of 2018 he moved to the Swedish Handbollsligan to IFK Kristianstad, where he signed a two-year contract. In October 2021 it was announced he had signed with German SG Flensburg-Handewitt, starting immediately.

International career
Teitur was the top scorer of the 2017 Men's Youth World Handball Championship in Georgia with 66 goals. On 5 April 2018 he made his debut for the Icelandic national team in a 29–31 loss against Norway in a friendly.

References

External links
IFK Kristianstad profile
EHF profile

1998 births
Living people
Teitur Orn Einarsson
IFK Kristianstad players
Expatriate handball players
Teitur Orn Einarsson